Bharatiya Pratiraksha Mazdoor Sangh (literally "Indian Defence Workers Union", abbreviated BPMS) is a trade union in India, affiliated to the Bharatiya Mazdoor Sangh, that organizes civilian workers in factories and other establishments under the Indian Ministry of Defence. The president is G Thirukumar and general secretary is Mukesh Singh .

Trade unions in India
Bharatiya Mazdoor Sangh-affiliated unions
Trade unions in Indian Defence
Defence and munitions trade unions